Bachia scaea is a species of lizard in the family Gymnophthalmidae. It is endemic to Brazil.

References

Bachia
Reptiles of Brazil
Endemic fauna of Brazil
Reptiles described in 2013
Taxa named by Mauro Teixeira Jr.
Taxa named by Francisco Dal Vechio
Taxa named by Pedro M. Sales-Nunes
Taxa named by Antonio Mollo Neto
Taxa named by Luciana Moreira Lobo
Taxa named by Luis Fernando Storti
Taxa named by Renato Augusto Junqueira Gaiga
Taxa named by Pedro Henrique Freire Dias
Taxa named by Miguel Trefaut Rodrigues